Disarm the Descent is the sixth studio album by American metalcore band Killswitch Engage.  The album was released on April 2, 2013, under Roadrunner Records.  It is the band's first album with Jesse Leach on vocals since 2002's Alive or Just Breathing.  Killswitch Engage announced the return of Leach in January 2012, after vocalist Howard Jones parted ways with the group due to illness. The album received generally positive reception from professional critics.

"In Due Time", the first single from the album, was nominated for "Best Metal Performance" at the 2014 Grammy Awards.

Background
Vocalist Jesse Leach stated about the album that "It is with a grateful spirit that we prepare for this record's release". "From the music, to the lyrics, to the artwork, we are all proud of what we have accomplished. To me, this is by far my best vocal performance, much thanks to Adam's guidance and faith in my abilities. I am very grateful to be where I am in life, back in an amazing band with a record we are all excited for the world to hear. Thanks to all the fans for their warm welcome back and their undying love for Killswitch Engage."

The album was produced by Adam Dutkiewicz and mixed by Andy Sneap. The album's artwork was created by bassist Mike D'Antonio and his graphic design company DarkicoN.

Musical style
Jesse Leach stated in an interview with Loudwire that "the music is definitely the fastest Killswitch record ever, it’s very heavy but still maintains the signature Killswitch hooky, melodic stuff there too. There’s definitely melody attached but I pulled out some new styles vocally, yelling and screaming and growling and layers and it sounds massive".

Drummer Justin Foley stated in a documentary, detailing the making of the album, that his drumming parts features more blast beats than the other previous albums.

Release
The album's first single, "In Due Time", was digitally released on February 5, 2013, and was made available for streaming on the band's YouTube channel on January 30, 2013. On February 27, 2013, the music video for "In Due Time" premiered on Rolling Stones website. On March 18, 2013, Killswitch Engage unveiled a second song from the album, titled "The New Awakening", on their YouTube channel. On March 26, 2013, Killswitch Engage allowed the completed album to be streamed online for 48 hours. A Special Edition version of the album, with alternate cover art, is also available digitally and on physical CD/DVD.  The DVD contains a thirty-minute documentary detailing the making of the album.

Reception

Critical
Critical reception for the album was highly positive; aggregate review website Metacritic assigned an overall score of 79 out of 100, based on reviews from six professional critics.

Gregory Heaney from Allmusic gave the album three out of five stars saying "In the time since Leach left the fold, Killswitch Engage have matured into a tighter, more refined band than they were for Alive or Just Breathing, and while Leach has certainly grown as a singer in the intervening years, the album doesn't quite recapture that sense of catharsis the band possessed back then."  Dean Brown from PopMatters gave the album a solid eight out of ten stars saying "Disarm the Descent is the bountiful fruit of the Killswitch’s rejuvenation, and proof that, in life and metal, there are second chances."

Commercial
The album sold 48,000 copies in the U.S. in its first week, debuting at number 7 on the Billboard 200 and number 1 in both the Top Hard Rock Albums Chart and the Top Rock Albums Chart.  The album has sold 158,000 copies in the US as of February 2016.

The album debuted at number 15 on the UK Albums Chart and number 6 on the ARIA Chart. Its current UK sales stand at over 83,000.

Track listing

Personnel
Killswitch Engage
Jesse Leach – lead vocals
Adam Dutkiewicz – lead guitar, backing vocals
Joel Stroetzel – rhythm guitar, backing vocals
Mike D'Antonio – bass
Justin Foley – drums

Technical personnel
Produced by Adam Dutkiewicz
Engineered by Adam Dutkiewicz & Jim Fogarty
Mixed & mastered by Andy Sneap
Inspiration by Alysha «Girouard» McCooe
A&R by Dave Rath
Art direction, Layout & design by DarkicoN Design
Photo by Jeremy Saffer & DarkicoN Design
Band photo by Travis Shinn
Cover model: Brenna Daugherty
Make-Up, Model: Christine McCarron
Stylist, Wardrobe: by Lena Utin

Charts

References

2013 albums
Albums produced by Adam Dutkiewicz
Killswitch Engage albums
Roadrunner Records albums